Byki is a rural locality (a selo) in Chaplinsky Selsoviet Rural Settlement, Kurchatovsky District, Kursk Oblast, Russia. Population:

Geography 
The selo is on the Seym River, 48 km south-west of Kursk, 10.5 km west of the district center – the town Kurchatov, 6.5 km from the selsoviet center – Chapli.

 Climate
Byki has a warm-summer humid continental climate (Dfb in the Köppen climate classification).

Transport 
Byki is located 4.5 km from the road of regional importance  (Kursk – Lgov – Rylsk – border with Ukraine), on the road of intermunicipal significance  (38K-017 – Byki), 5 km from the nearest railway station Blokhino (railway line Lgov I — Kursk).

The rural locality is situated 55 km from Kursk Vostochny Airport, 137 km from Belgorod International Airport and 258 km from Voronezh Peter the Great Airport.

References

Notes

Sources

Rural localities in Kurchatovsky District, Kursk Oblast
Lgovsky Uyezd